The 2018–19 Utah Valley Wolverines men's basketball team represented Utah Valley University in the 2018–19 NCAA Division I men's basketball season. The Wolverines, led by fourth-year head coach Mark Pope, played their home games at the UCCU Center in Orem, Utah as members of the Western Athletic Conference. They finished the season 25–10, 12–4 in WAC play to finish in second place. They defeated UMKC in the quarterfinals of the WAC tournament before losing in the semifinals to Grand Canyon. They were invited to the College Basketball Invitational where they defeated Cal State Northridge in the first round before losing in the quarterfinals to South Florida.

Previous season
The Wolverines finished the 2017–18 season 23–11, 10–4 in WAC play to finish in second place. They defeated Cal State Bakersfield in the quarterfinals of the WAC tournament before losing in the semifinals to Grand Canyon. They were invited to the College Basketball Invitational where they defeated Eastern Washington in the first round before losing in the quarterfinals to San Francisco.

Roster

Schedule and results 

|-
!colspan=9 style=| Exhibition

|-
!colspan=9 style=| Non-conference regular season

|-
!colspan=9 style=| WAC regular season

|-
!colspan=9 style=""| WAC tournament
|-

|-
!colspan=9 style=""| College Basketball Invitational
|-

Source:

References

Utah Valley Wolverines men's basketball seasons
Utah Valley
Utah Valley